Bani Dhabyan is a sub-district located in Bani Dhabyan District, Sana'a Governorate, Yemen. Bani Dhabyan had a population of 16209 according to the 2004 census.

References 

Sub-districts in Bani Dhabyan District